Elisha W. Edgerton (June 26, 1815 – April 15, 1904) was an American businessman and politician who served as a member of the Wisconsin State Assembly in 1863.

Early life 
Edgerton was born in South Coventry, Connecticut.

Career 
Edgerton worked in New York City and Chicago, Illinois before moving to Milwaukee, Wisconsin Territory to work for Solomon Juneau. Edgerton worked in the grain, tobacco, and livestock business and eventually established a model farm in Summit, Waukesha County, Wisconsin. Edgerton served in the first Wisconsin Constitutional Convention of 1846 and in the Wisconsin State Assembly in 1863. Edgerton was a member of the Democratic Party of Wisconsin.

Personal life 
His brother was Benjamin Hyde Edgerton a businessman and territorial legislator. Edgerton died in Milwaukee, Wisconsin.

Notes

1815 births
1904 deaths
People from Coventry, Connecticut
Politicians from Milwaukee
Businesspeople from Milwaukee
Members of the Wisconsin State Assembly
19th-century American politicians
19th-century American businesspeople